is a Japanese ski jumper. In the World Cup he finished once among the top 10, recording an eighth place from January 2001 in Park City, Utah.

2008–2009 he made a comeback to the Japan Ski jump team in the Fis World cup.

External links

1982 births
Living people
Japanese male ski jumpers
Ski jumpers at the 2014 Winter Olympics
Olympic ski jumpers of Japan
Asian Games medalists in ski jumping
Ski jumpers at the 2003 Asian Winter Games
Ski jumpers at the 2011 Asian Winter Games
Asian Games gold medalists for Japan
Asian Games silver medalists for Japan
Medalists at the 2003 Asian Winter Games
Medalists at the 2011 Asian Winter Games